Equisetum scirpoides (dwarf scouring rush or dwarf horsetail) Michx., Fl. Bor.-Amer. 2: 281 (1803). 2 n = 216. The smallest of the currently occurring representatives of the genus Equisetum (horsetail).

The smallest Equisetum, E. scirpoides has circumpolar distribution. Plants create compact and dense clumps, reaching a maximum height of about 30 cm. The assimilation and generative shoots are identical and grow together. The leaves reduced to a black sheath around the stem. The stems are green, unbranched, thick and about 1 mm with six ribs. The generative shoots with small cones dying after sowing the spores. The nodes occur at approximately 1 – 3 cm. The leaves are very small to about 1 mm, and arranged in around nodes. The corms are thin, yellow and brown. The roots very fine, black and densely surpassing the ground. Species grows best in the mud at the depth zone from 0 to 3 cm. Specimens reproduce primarily by vegetative division. Equisetum scirpoides is hardy and semi-evergreen. This species is quite a popular decorative plant seen in garden ponds, ornamental gardens and assumptions in nearly the whole world. E. scirpoides was discovered and described by French botanist André Michaux. Detailed studies were conducted by the American botanist Oliver Atkins Farwell.

Name
Equisetum, from the Latin, equus, "horse", and seta, "bristle, animal hair". Scirpoides, from the Latin, scirpus, "rush, bulrush". Scouring Rush, a reference to its early use for cleaning pots, made possible by its high silica content. Other common names include dwarf horsetail, sedge horsetail, prele faux-scirpe (Qué), tradfräken (Swe), dvergsnelle (Nor), trad-padderok (Dan), hentokorte (Fin), dwergholpijp (NL), himedokusa (Jpn), skrzyp arktyczny (PL).

Distribution
Austria, Finland, Norway, Spitsbergen, Sweden, Greenland, St. Pierre & MiqueIon, Canada (Alberta, British Columbia, Manitoba, New Brunswick, Newfoundland, N.W.Territories, Nunavut, Nova Scotia, Ontario, Prince Edward Isl., Quebec, Saskatchewan, Yukon), Alaska, USA (Idaho, Illinois, Iowa, Maine, Massachusetts, Michigan, Minnesota, Montana, New Hampshire, New York, South Dakota, Vermont, Washington, Wisconsin), W-Siberia, C-Siberia, E-Siberia, Amur, Ussuri, Japan, Novaja Zemlja, Kamchatka, N-European Russia, Lithuania, Estonia, C-European Russia, E-European Russia.

Subspecies
Within Equisetum scirpoides there are two subspecies :
Equisetum scirpoides ssp. scirpoides (A. Michaux, Fl. Bor.-Amer. 2: 281. 1803)
Hippochaete scirpoides (Michaux, Farwell) - Main subspecies, grows up to about 30 cm. Low, slender, wiry, unbranched stems. Stems erect or prostrate, hollow, segmented, rough surfaced, green. Internodes about 4 apart with segments marked by ashy grey bands. Sterile and fertile stems alike. Twisting and wiry in form, branching rare. Sheaths tiny, 1 - 2.5 mm × 0.75 - 1.5 mm, with three teeth, dark with white margins. Cones usually 1 long with sharp pointed tips, borne on short stalks at the tips of fertile stems. Spores green, spheric. Rootstalk shiny black, creeping, freely branching, and wide spreading. Roots black to very dark brown.

Equisetum scirpoides ssp. walkowiaki (R. J. Walkowiak, IEA Paper 2008)
Equisetum scirpoides (ssp.) minus (Lawson, Milde) - Smaller subspecies, grows up to about 15 cm. The botanical characteristics identical with the main subspecies. Often seen primarily as an ornamental plant in Japan. Subspecies described by Scottish botanist George Lawson and eminent German botanist Carl August Julius Milde, but without a proper taxonomic name, which gave the Polish botanist Radosław Janusz Walkowiak (subsp. walkowiaki).

Identification
Identifiable as a horsetail by the upright, hollow, jointed, cylindrical stems with inconsequential and easily overlooked leaves. Distinguished from other horsetails by its low, slender, wiry, unbranched stems and its small size. This is the smallest living horsetail. Field marks, diminutive size, low, slender, wiry, unbranched stems.

See also
 Fern
 Equisetum

References

 , Equisetum species in the World – Equisetum (Horsetail) Taxonomy.
 , Checklist of Ferns and Lycophytes of the World – Equisetum Species Taxonomy.
  1963, A  taxonomic  monograph  of  the  genus  Equisetum  subgenus Hippochaete. Beihefte zur Nova Hedwigia 8: 1–123.
  2001, National Collection of Equisetum – . Version of 2001-OCT-04. Retrieved 2008-NOV-20.

External links

 Equisetum scirpoides (Dwarf Scouring Rush)
 Equisetum scirpoides, Shiro TSUYUZAKI (Hokkaido University)
 Equisetum scirpoides Michx.

scirpoides
Garden plants
Taxa named by André Michaux